This page lists all described species of the spider family Symphytognathidae accepted by the World Spider Catalog :

Anapistula

Anapistula Gertsch, 1941
 A. appendix Tong & Li, 2006 — China
 A. aquytabuera Rheims & Brescovit, 2003 — Brazil
 A. ataecina Cardoso & Scharff, 2009 — Portugal
 A. australia Forster, 1959 — Australia (Queensland)
 A. ayri Rheims & Brescovit, 2003 — Brazil
 A. bebuia Rheims & Brescovit, 2003 — Brazil
 A. benoiti Forster & Platnick, 1977 — Congo
 A. bifurcata Harvey, 1998 — Australia (Northern Territory)
 A. boneti Forster, 1958 — Mexico
 A. caecula Baert & Jocqué, 1993 — Ivory Coast
 A. choojaiae Rivera-Quiroz, Petcharad & Miller, 2021 — Thailand
 A. cuttacutta Harvey, 1998 — Australia (Northern Territory)
 A. equatoriana Dupérré & Tapia, 2017 — Ecuador
 A. guyri Rheims & Brescovit, 2003 — Brazil
 A. ishikawai Ono, 2002 — Japan
 A. jerai Harvey, 1998 — Malaysia, Indonesia (Kalimantan, Krakatau), Borneo
 A. orbisterna Lin, Pham & Li, 2009 — Vietnam
 A. panensis Lin, Tao & Li, 2013 — China
 A. pocaruguara Rheims & Brescovit, 2003 — Brazil
 A. secreta Gertsch, 1941 (type) — USA to Colombia, Bahama Is., Jamaica
 A. seychellensis Saaristo, 1996 — Seychelles
 A. tonga Harvey, 1998 — Tonga
 A. troglobia Harvey, 1998 — Australia (Western Australia)
 A. ybyquyra Rheims & Brescovit, 2003 — Brazil
 A. yungas Rubio & González, 2010 — Argentina
 A. zhengi Lin, Tao & Li, 2013 — China

Anapogonia

Anapogonia Simon, 1905
 A. lyrata Simon, 1905 (type) — Indonesia (Java)

Crassignatha

Crassignatha Wunderlich, 1995
 C. baihua Lin & S. Q. Li, 2020 — China
 C. bangbie Lin & S. Q. Li, 2020 — China
 C. bicorniventris (Lin & Li, 2009) — China (Hainan)
 C. changyan Lin & S. Q. Li, 2020 — China
 C. danaugirangensis Miller et al., 2014 — Borneo (Malaysia, Brunei)
 C. dongnai Lin & S. Q. Li, 2020 — Vietnam
 C. ertou Miller, Griswold & Yin, 2009 — China
 C. gucheng Lin & S. Q. Li, 2020 — China, Vietnam
 C. gudu Miller, Griswold & Yin, 2009 — China
 C. haeneli Wunderlich, 1995 (type) — Malaysia (Peninsula)
 C. longtou Miller, Griswold & Yin, 2009 — China
 C. mengla Lin & S. Q. Li, 2020 — China
 C. nantou Lin & S. Q. Li, 2020 — Taiwan
 C. nasalis Lin & S. Q. Li, 2020 — China
 C. pianma Miller, Griswold & Yin, 2009 — China
 C. quadriventris (Lin & Li, 2009) — China (Hainan)
 C. quanqu Miller, Griswold & Yin, 2009 — China
 C. rostriformis Lin & S. Q. Li, 2020 — China
 C. seedam Rivera-Quiroz, Petcharad & Miller, 2021 — Thailand
 C. seeliam Rivera-Quiroz, Petcharad & Miller, 2021 — Thailand
 C. shiluensis (Lin & Li, 2009) — China, Laos, Thailand
 C. shunani Lin & S. Q. Li, 2020 — China
 C. si Lin & S. Q. Li, 2020 — China
 C. spinathoraxi (Lin & Li, 2009) — China
 C. thamphra Lin & S. Q. Li, 2020 — Thailand
 C. xichou Lin & S. Q. Li, 2020 — China
 C. yamu Miller, Griswold & Yin, 2009 — China
 C. yinzhi Miller, Griswold & Yin, 2009 — China

Curimagua

Curimagua Forster & Platnick, 1977
 C. bayano Forster & Platnick, 1977 — Panama
 C. chapmani Forster & Platnick, 1977 (type) — Venezuela

Globignatha

Globignatha Balogh & Loksa, 1968
 G. rohri (Balogh & Loksa, 1968) (type) — Brazil
 G. sedgwicki Forster & Platnick, 1977 — Belize

Iardinis

Iardinis Simon, 1899
 I. martensi Brignoli, 1978 — Nepal
 I. mussardi Brignoli, 1980 — India

Patu

Patu Marples, 1951
 P. bispina Lin, Pham & Li, 2009 — Vietnam
 P. digua Forster & Platnick, 1977 — Colombia
 P. eberhardi Forster & Platnick, 1977 — Colombia
 P. jidanweishi Miller, Griswold & Yin, 2009 — China
 P. kishidai Shinkai, 2009 — Japan
 P. marplesi Forster, 1959 — Samoa
 P. nigeri Lin & Li, 2009 — China
 P. qiqi Miller, Griswold & Yin, 2009 — China
 P. saladito Forster & Platnick, 1977 — Colombia
 P. samoensis Marples, 1951 — Samoa
 P. silho Saaristo, 1996 — Seychelles
 P. vitiensis Marples, 1951 (type) — Fiji
 P. woodwardi Forster, 1959 — New Guinea
 P. xiaoxiao Miller, Griswold & Yin, 2009 — China

Symphytognatha

Symphytognatha Hickman, 1931
 S. blesti Forster & Platnick, 1977 — Australia (New South Wales)
 S. brasiliana Balogh & Loksa, 1968 — Brazil
 S. cabezota Dupérré & Tapia, 2017 — Ecuador
 S. carstica Brescovit, Álvares & Lopes, 2004 — Brazil
 S. chickeringi Forster & Platnick, 1977 — Jamaica
 S. fouldsi Harvey, 2001 — Australia (Western Australia)
 S. gertschi Forster & Platnick, 1977 — Mexico
 S. globosa Hickman, 1931 (type) — Australia (Tasmania)
 S. goodnightorum Forster & Platnick, 1977 — Belize
 S. imbulunga Griswold, 1987 — South Africa
 S. milleri Lin, 2019 — China
 S. orghidani Georgescu, 1988 — Cuba
 S. picta Harvey, 1992 — Australia (Western Australia)
 S. tacaca Brescovit, Álvares & Lopes, 2004 — Brazil
 S. ulur Platnick, 1979 — New Guinea

References

Symphytognathidae